The Volkswagen Constellation is the flagship truck produced by the Brazilian manufacturer Volkswagen Truck & Bus since 2005. The line covering the 13-57 tonne gross combination mass (GCM) segment.  It is produced at Resende in Brazil, and is primarily for the South American market.

The truck, a "cab-over-engine" released in September 2005, was designed in Volkswagen's Wolfsburg Design Studio at Volkswagen Group Headquarters, but engineered by Volkswagen Truck and Bus, in Brazil, South Africa, and mainland Europe - on a rigorous 7 million kilometre test phase over a four-year period.

In 2006, Renato Martins won the Brazilian Fórmula Truck Championship in the Constellation's first season racing.

Variants
The cab is available in daycab and sleeper cab configurations.

A further three models were subsequently launched in 2007; a 19.370, 25.370, and 31.370, with a Volkswagen Caminhões e Ônibus engineered and MWM produced  Volkswagen NGD 370 diesel engine.

Powertrain

VW NGD 370 engine
The Volkswagen Group NGD 370 turbodiesel engine premiers new attributes for the heavy trucks sector.  The high "flat" torque at low engine speeds is improved by a variable geometry turbo-compressor: the Multi Turbo System - MTS. Its cylinder head features four valves per cylinder, displaces  (9.4 litres), and generates  at 2,000 rpm. It also comes with the Dual Power Brake – DPB.

It features an exclusive high pressure direct fuel injection similar to the Pumpe Düse (PD) system found in Volkswagen's car engines, the Hydraulic Electronic Unit Injector - HEUI – with electro-hydraulic digital unit injectors and extended durability, developed by the partner company Siemens/VDO. An important advantage is the removable wet cylinder liners which will assist with easier maintenance and lower costs.

Its Multi Turbo System (MTS) turbine with variable vane geometry, is electronically controlled. This helps achieve faster responses, better performance, and better thermal efficiency. This also works as part of the engine brake retarder in the exhaust system. The water-cooled exhaust gas recirculation (EGR) system, coupled with the cylinder block, reutilises part of the exhaust gasses, producing combustion at lower temperatures with less discharge rates.

It includes a new engine brake system, the Dual Power Brake (DPB) fed into the cylinder head, is electronically integrated into the turbocharger. It is claimed that the advantages are: increasing the operational average speed, the brake force, safety, retaking with fuel reduction, and speed on downward slopes. This means less gear shifts, lower maintenance costs, and helps improve the service life of the brakes and tyres.

Transmission
Clutches on all variants are the hydraulically operated with pneumatic assistance single-plate diaphragm type. The engine output is routed through a variety of transmissions. One option is the ZF 16S 1685 TD 16-speed manual synchromesh transmission. This latest ZF box is  lighter than existing models, due to its all-aluminium alloy casings.

The 6x2 variants use a Meritor MS 23-185 tractive rear axle, and this has a maximum capacity of 60 tons. It includes a series differential locking system when used on the VW 25.370 tractor unit.

The 6x2 variants also have the facility for partial or total lifting of the third axle, which helps achieve better traction, particularly on slopes. This Extra Traction Device (ETD) ensures part of the third axle load, during partial lifting, is transferred to the tractive axle.

6x4 variants utilise Meritor MD/MR 25-168 tractive rear axles, and are located via Randon S.A. rear suspension (bogie type rigid shafts in tandem).

Specifications

References

External links

Volkswagen Constellation International portal

Constellation
Cab over vehicles
Trucks of Brazil
Vehicles introduced in 2005